Sosny (English translation - Pines), a part of the Zavodski District of Minsk, is a suburb approximately 15 kilometers outside of the centre of Minsk, Belarus. Hidden in the tall Minsk pines, Sosny has a population of about 3,000. Until 1991, Sosny was home to a scientific nuclear reactor that was used for both military and civil purposes.

References 

Microraions of Minsk